Mary Caroline McLeod is a professor at Columbia University known for her examination of modern architecture, especially the work of Le Corbusier. She is a fellow of the Society of Architectural Historians.

Education and career 
McLeod has a B.S., M.Arch, and a Ph.D. from Princeton University. As of 2021, she is a professor of architecture at Columbia Graduate School of Architecture, Planning and Preservation (GSAPP). She has also previously worked as a professor at Harvard University, the Institute for Architecture and Urban Studies, University of Miami, and University of Kentucky.

McLeod's essays have been published in journals and anthologies such as Oppositions, Assemblage, Art Journal, Harvard Design Magazine, AA Files, JSAH, Casabella, The Sex of Architecture, Architecture in Fashion, Architecture of the Everyday, Architecture and Feminism, The Pragmatist Imagination, Architecture Theory since 1968, The State of Architecture, Fragments: Architecture and the Unfinished, Le Parole dell'Architettura, and Modern Women: Women Artists at The Museum of Modern Art. Her main focus is on modern architecture specially Le Corbusier and she received the Arnold Brunner grant in 2015 which she used to research Le Corbusier's response to World War II.

In 2019, McLeod was one of three who study architecture and joined to discuss Bauhaus architecture with Architectural Record. McLeod has also published on the English architect Alan Colquhoun and organized the 2021 colloquium celebrating his life. McLeod and Victoria Rosner led an effort to expand knowledge about women in architecture through five years of research in the field. The resulting website was launched by the Beverly Willis Architecture Foundation in 2017. McLeod has also been quoted in the Christian Science Monitor for her work noting that female architects "...don't have as much panache for the big glitter jobs".

Selected bibliography

Recognition
In 2020, McLeod was named a fellow of the Society of Architectural Historians.

References

External links
Pioneering women in architecture

Architectural theoreticians
Architecture educators
Columbia University faculty
Princeton University School of Architecture alumni
Living people
Year of birth missing (living people)